Euides is a genus of planthoppers belonging to the family Delphacidae.

The genus was first described by Fieber in 1866.

The species of this genus are found in Europe and Northern America.

Species:
 Euides speciosa (Boheman, 1845)

References

Delphacidae